The Dean of the Faculty of Advocates, also known as the Dean of Faculty, is the head of the Faculty of Advocates, the independent body for advocates in Scotland. The Dean is elected by the whole membership.

List of deans of Faculty

 1582 to ????: John Sharp

17th-century

 1655 to ????: John Nisbet
 1661 to ????: John Ellis of Elliston
 1664 to ????: Robert Sinclair of Longformacus
 1672 to ????: George Lockhart
 1675 to ????: Sir Andrew Birnie. Later Lord Saline.
 1680 to ????: Sir John Dalrymple
 1682 to 1689: George Mackenzie of Rosehaugh
 1690 to ????: Sir John Dalrymple
 1691 to ????: Sir Robert Colt
 1694 to 1695: Sir James Stewart
 1695 to 1698: Hew Dalrymple
 1698 to >1708: Robert Bennet

18th-century

 1698 to >1708: Robert Bennet
 1712 to 1721: Sir David Dalrymple
 1721 to 1722: Robert Dundas of Arniston, the Elder
 1722 to 1746: ??
 1746 to 1760: Robert Dundas of Arniston, the younger
 1760 to 1764: James Ferguson
 1764 to 1775: Alexander Lockhart
 ???? to 1785: Henry Dundas
 1785 to 1795: Henry Erskine
 1796 to ????: Robert Dundas (1758–1819) 

19th-century

 1801 to 1808: Robert Blair
 1808 to 1823: Matthew Ross of Candie
 1823 to 1826: George Cranstoun
 1826 to ????: Sir James Wellwood Moncreiff, 9th Baronet
 1829: Francis Jeffrey
 1830 to 1841: John Hope
 1842 to 1843: Patrick Robertson
 1843 to 1851: Duncan McNeill
 1852: John Marshall
 1852 to 1858: ??
 1858 to 1869: James Moncreiff
 1868 to 1874: Edward Gordon
 1874 to 1875: Andrew Rutherfurd-Clark
 1875 to 1876: William Watson
 1877: Robert Horne
 1878 to 1881: Patrick Fraser
 1881: Alexander Kinnear
 1882 to 1885: John Macdonald
 1885 to 1886: John Balfour
 1886 to 1889: ??
 1889 to 1892: John Balfour (second term)
 1892 to 1895: Charles Pearson 
 1895 to 1905: Alexander Asher

20th-century

 1895 to 1905: Alexander Asher
 1905 to 1908: William Campbell
 1908 to 1915: Charles Dickson 
 1915 to 1918: James Avon Clyde 
 1919 to 1920: Charles Murray
 1920 to 1922: Andrew Constable
 Condie Sandeman fl. 1927
 1932 to 1936: Sir William Chree
 1936 to 1937: James Keith 
 1937 to 1939: William Donald Patrick
 1939 to 1945: James Gordon McIntyre, Lord Sorn
 1945 to 1948: James Reid
 1948 to 1955: John Cameron
 1955 to 1957: Christopher Guest
 1957: Charles Shaw 
 1959 to 1964: Ian Fraser
 1964 to 1965: Alexander Thomson
 1965 to 1970: George Emslie
 1970 to 1972: Robert Smith Johnston
 1973 to 1976: Donald Ross
 1976 to 1979: James Mackay
 1979 to 1983: Charles Kemp Davidson
 1983 to 1986: William Prosser
 1986 to 1989: David Hope
 1989 to 1994: Alan Johnston
 1994 to 1997: Andrew Hardie
 1997 to 2001: Nigel Emslie

21st-century

 1997 to 2001: Nigel Emslie
 2001 to 2004: Colin Campbell
 2004 to 2007: Robert Logan "Roy" Martin 
 2007 to 2014: Richard Keen
 2014 to 2016: James Wolffe 
 2016 to 2020: Gordon Jackson
 2020 to present: Roddy Dunlop

References